On the Right Track is a 1981 American romantic comedy film with the feature film debut of Gary Coleman.  It was directed by Lee Philips, produced by Ronald Jacobs, and released to theaters by 20th Century Fox in Spring 1981.

Production
After his first introduction of the NBC sitcom Diff'rent Strokes in November 1978, Gary Coleman quickly gained popularity. Zephyr Productions was created to promote Coleman's star potential, and the year's On the Right Track was the first film developed from that initiative.  It was filmed in 1980, primarily in Chicago.  New York Loves Lester was an early working title for the project, when the film was going to be set in New York City, but moved to Chicago.  The subsequent working title was A Guy Could Get Killed Out There.

Plot
 
A young, homeless shoeshine black boy named Lester is living in a locker at Union Station, Chicago. Already a beloved figure among the staff at the station who look after him, and avoiding attempts to move him to an orphanage, he finds great popularity after it is revealed that he has an amazing talent for picking winning horses at the racetrack.

Cast
 Gary Coleman as Lester
 Maureen Stapleton as Mary the Bag Lady
 Norman Fell as the Mayor
 Michael Lembeck as Frank Biscardi
 Lisa Eilbacher as Jill Klein
 Bill Russell as Robert
 Herb Edelman as Sam
 Nathan Davis as Mario
 Fern Persons as Flower Lady
 Mike Genovese as Louis
 Harry Gorsuch as Harry
 Page Hannah as Sally
 Jami Gertz as Big Girl
 Chelcie Ross  as Customer

Reception

Though it received a number of reviews concluding that it was overly sappy or simply capitalizing on Coleman's TV following, Gene Siskel of the Chicago Tribune, Roger Ebert of the Chicago Sun-Times, and Kevin Thomas of the Los Angeles Times gave it somewhat more positive reviews. Gary Coleman earned a Razzie Award nomination for Worst Actor for his performance in the film, but lost to Klinton Spilsbury for The Legend of the Lone Ranger.

The film was released on VHS in the 1980s, but it has never seen an official release on DVD.  The movie has not received much attention in latter years, though a short article in Entertainment Weekly in 2004 compared the film to the then newly released Tom Hanks film The Terminal, where Hanks' character lives for months in an airport terminal.

References

External links
 
 
 
 

1981 films
1981 romantic comedy films
20th Century Fox films
Films shot in Chicago
Films set in Chicago
Films directed by Lee Philips
Films scored by Arthur B. Rubinstein
Films about homelessness
Films about orphans
1980s English-language films